The Germany women's national under-20 volleyball team represents Germany in international women's volleyball competitions and friendly matches under the age 20 and it is ruled by the Deutcher Volleyball Verband That is an affiliate of International Volleyball Federation FIVB and also a part of European Volleyball Confederation CEV.

Results

FIVB U20 World Championship
 Champions   Runners up   Third place   Fourth place

Europe U19 Championship
 Champions   Runners up   Third place   Fourth place

Team

Current squad
The following is the German roster in the 2016 European U19 Championship.

Head coach:  Jan Lindenmair

References

External links
 Official website 

National women's under-20 volleyball teams
Volleyball in Germany
Volleyball